Xiaoshan International Airport is a metro station on Line 1, Line 7 and Line 19 of Hangzhou Metro in China. It is located near the Terminal 3 of Hangzhou Xiaoshan International Airport. The station began its service on 30 December 2020, together with the inauguration of Line 1 Phase 3 and Line 7. The station has 3 exits.

Entrances and exits 

 A  : Domestic Terminal 1 and 3, International and HK & Macau & Taiwan Terminal 2
 B (To be opened later)  : Terminal 4
 C : Domestic Terminal 1 and 3, International and HK & Macau & Taiwan Terminal 2

Station layout

Gallery

References 

Railway stations in Zhejiang
Railway stations in China opened in 2020
Hangzhou Metro stations